Pius Ngandu Nkashama is a professor, writer, playwright, poet and literary critic. He was born in 1946 in Mbujimayi in the province of Kasai Oriental in the Democratic Republic of the Congo.

After a degree in philosophy and letters at Lovanium University in 1970, he was appointed as assistant professor and professor at the National University of Zaire (Lubumbashi). He also led the Centre of African Studies. In the late 1970s, he flew to France where he obtained in 1981 a PhD in Arts and Humanities at the University of Strasbourg. Thereafter, he traveled the world to teach in various universities (Annaba and Constantine in Algeria, Limoges and the Sorbonne in France). Since 2000, he has settled in the United States where he works as professor of French Language and Literature at Louisiana State University.

In 2004, he was awarded the Fonlon-Nichols award in support of democratic values, humanistic thought and literary excellence in an author of African origin.

References 

Democratic Republic of the Congo dramatists and playwrights
Democratic Republic of the Congo poets
Literary critics
1946 births
Living people
Lovanium University alumni
Academic staff of the National University of Zaire